Shell Residential Area, also commonly called Shell RA or just RA,  is a well-planned and affluent neighborhood of Port Harcourt city in Rivers State. It is predominantly residential, and is mainly occupied by Shell's local and expatriate staff and dependants.

Geography
Shell Residential Area is located at  (4.851779, 7.047472) and its postal area zip code is 500211. Its boundaries are East West Road to the north, Rumuokwurushi Road to the east, Port Harcourt-Aba Expressway to the south, and Eliozu/Okporo Road to the west. The road distance between Port Harcourt's Elelenwo neighborhood and Shell RA is approximately 3.5 kilometres (2.0 miles).

Education
Rumukoroshe School - Located at the old Shell Club site. Since 1968 Rumukoroshe School has been offering a high quality international education for the children (aged 3–14) of both expatriate and Nigerian Shell staff. It is operated by the Shell Petroleum Development Company and the teaching staff have degrees and teaching qualifications from some of the most prestigious universities around the world. The school has attained International Primary Curriculum (IPC) accreditation at Mastering level. The school teaches the English National Curriculum for Maths and English and a progression of the IEYC, IPC and IMYC for all other subjects. It also prepares children for their IGCSE's in the Middle Year classes.

Points of interest
Rumuokwurusi Golf Club - Formed in 1965. The golf club, as of 2010, had just over 100 members. Its 9-hole course layout holds a Standard Scratch Score of 64 (men) and 66 (women).
The Shell Club - Previously known as Shell Senior Staff Club. It first operated under a thatched roof joint from mid 1957 — early 1958. By mid 1960, the club had moved into a new space which would become its permanent building. Shell Club is known to offer facilities for fitness, such as gym, swimming pools, and courts for racket sports. There are also a number of bars and restaurants serving at the complex.

References

External links
The Shell Club Port Harcourt

Neighbourhoods in Port Harcourt
Obio-Akpor